Steve DeVries and David Macpherson were the defending champions, but lost in the first round this year.

Guy Forget and Henri Leconte won the title, defeating Luke Jensen and Scott Melville 6–4, 7–5 in the final.

Seeds

Draw

Finals

Top half

Bottom half

References
 Draw

Newsweek Champions Cup Doubles